Lin Wan-ting (born 24 February 1996) is a Taiwanese taekwondo practitioner. She made her first appearance in international competition at the 2013 East Asian Games. Lin placed third at the 2014 Asian Taekwondo Championships in May, and followed with a second-place finish at the 2014 Asian Games.

References

External links
 

Living people
Taiwanese female taekwondo practitioners
Asian Games medalists in taekwondo
Taekwondo practitioners at the 2014 Asian Games
1996 births
Asian Games silver medalists for Chinese Taipei
Medalists at the 2014 Asian Games
Universiade medalists in taekwondo
Universiade gold medalists for Chinese Taipei
World Taekwondo Championships medalists
Asian Taekwondo Championships medalists
Medalists at the 2015 Summer Universiade
21st-century Taiwanese women